Rotstock, Rothstock or Rostock is a former underground railway station on the tunnelled section of the Jungfrau Railway in the Bernese Oberland region of Switzerland.

The station opened on 2 August 1899, with the extension of the Jungfraubahn from its previous terminus at Eigergletscher station. After further construction, the line was extended to Eigerwand station on 28 June 1903. Today, all that remains of the station is a door that leads into the open.

References 

Railway stations in the canton of Bern
Railway stations in Switzerland opened in 1899